Cypress Lake High School Center for the Arts is a secondary school located in Fort Myers, Florida. Cypress Lake High School is a high school in the South Zone specializing in five arts programs: Music, Dance, Media, Theatre, and Visual arts.

Cypress Lake has AP programs and an extensive ESOL program.

Center for the Arts
Cypress Lake High School's secondary campus, the Center for Arts, was established in 1994 and is exclusively for students with a concentration in one of the arts programs; it is located north of the main campus and consists of five distinct departments. In the past, Cypress Lake High School and Cypress Lake Center for the Arts were separate institutions and therefore had separate sets of administration and staff. Students attending Cypress Lake Center for the Arts would take their academic classes at Cypress Lake High School. Today, they are one coherent school, with the same staff and administration.

Arts programs offered at the school: 
Media Arts: The Media Department specializes in television production and digital editing. The department's video editing technique is non-linear, using Adobe Premiere. The department has a full-sized television studio, with four cameras and a fully functional control room, as well as a full computer lab.

Music: The Music Department is divided into three smaller departments run by individual teachers, each focusing on orchestra, vocal, or band, along with running a music theory class. In 2003, the Camerata Orchestra was invited to National Orchestra Festival. The A Capella Group (referred to simply as TAG) has also received national recognition, competing in competitions from New York City to Memphis, TX. The A Capella Group also releases an album at the end of each school year, and has since 2015. Each album compiles covers of popular songs mixed with original arrangements and songs. In 2009, the Cypress Lake Wind Ensemble performed at Carnegie Hall for the National Band Festival.

Dance: The Dance Department teaches Ballet, Choreography, Dance Tech, and Repertory. There are two large dance floors and instructors. Shows are put on in school's Auditorium.

Theatre: The Theatre Department instructs students in the dramatic arts, technical theatre, and stages many performances each year. The department building contains a black box theater where straight plays and cabarets are held, and an outdoor amphitheater is also on campus. Musicals are performed once a year in the school's auditorium.

Visual Arts: The Visual Arts Department teaches the crafts of drawing, painting, pottery, computer graphics, digital art, photography and a variety of other mediums. The department has a dark room to develop pictures and computers for digital art and research. Every year they hold various art shows and at the end of the year a senior art show featuring the artwork of the graduating class.

Notable alumni
Charles Ghigna, poet and children's author known as "Father Goose;" taught English at Cypress Lake High School, 1967–1973
Jan Hooks, Class of 1975, Actress and Cast Member Saturday Night Live.
Haely Jardas, actress and Miss District of Columbia 2015.
Vonzell Solomon, 3rd-place winner on season 4 of American Idol
De'Vondre Campbell, linebacker Green Bay Packers.
Rhyleigh Plank, singer and vocalist who gained national recognition performing on The Voice.

References

External links

1963 establishments in Florida
High schools in Lee County, Florida
Educational institutions established in 1963
Magnet schools in Florida
Public high schools in Florida